Love Life is the third studio album by American new wave band Berlin. It was released on March 12, 1984, by Geffen Records. Recorded between October and December 1983, the album features production from Mike Howlett, Giorgio Moroder, and Richie Zito. Four singles were released from the album, including "No More Words", which became the band's first top-40 single on the US Billboard Hot 100, peaking at number 23. Later, second single "Now It's My Turn" peaked at #74. The album itself became the band's highest-charting album on the Billboard 200, peaking at number 23.

Reception

From contemporary reviews, Ken Tucker of The Philadelphia Inquirer gave the album a one stars out of five rating, stating that Berlin "prove their mediocrity by being unable to sound funky even when dance-King Giorgio Moroder is behind the studio console."

Track listing

Notes
 The tracks "Rumor of Love" and "Lost in the Crowd" are not included on the original LP releases.
 The 2020 CD reissue moves "Rumor of Love" and "Lost in the Crowd" to immediately after "Fall" and adds three bonus remixes.

Personnel
Credits adapted from the liner notes of the 1987 CD release of Love Life.

Berlin

 Terri Nunn – lead vocals, background vocals, backing vocals arrangements
 John Crawford – bass, lead vocals, background vocals
 David Diamond – synthesizers, background vocals
 Ric Olsen – guitars
 Matt Reid – synthesizers
 Rob Brill – drums

Additional musicians
 Arthur Barrow – additional keyboard programming

Technical

 Mike Howlett – production 
 Giorgio Moroder – production 
 Richie Zito – production 
 Connie Hill – recording engineering
 Mike Shipley – mixing engineering
 Eddie Delena – mixing engineering assistance
 Dave Collins – digital machine operator
 Stewart Whitmore – digital editing
 Brian Reeves – engineering 
 Mick Guzauski – engineering 
 Steve Hodge – engineering 
 Steve Hall – mastering at Future Disc (Hollywood)

Artwork
 Richard Seireeni – art direction
 Phillip Dixon – cover photography
 Douglas Bryant – inner sleeve photo

Charts

Weekly charts

Year-end charts

Certifications

Notes

References

1984 albums
Albums produced by Giorgio Moroder
Albums produced by Mike Howlett
Albums produced by Richie Zito
Berlin (band) albums
Geffen Records albums